CGER may refer to:

 ASLK / CGER, a former Belgian bank
 Gross enrolment ratio